Enrique Olvera (born 1976) is a Mexican chef. He is the owner and head chef of Pujol, a Mexican haute cuisine restaurant in Mexico City, which is currently ranked 9th in the world according to the 2021 annual The World's 50 Best Restaurants listing.

Film 
Olvera appeared on Netflix Chef's Table in Season 2, Episode 4.

Olvera was a judge on the first episode of the 2018 Netflix series The Final Table.

Olvera and his restaurant Pujol was featured in the first season of Netflix series Somebody Feed Phil, in the episode "Mexico City"

Olvera also appeared in Season 12 of MasterChef UK

Olvera appears in the third episode of the 2020 Amazon-produced series Pan y Circo, where he prepares a meal for guests discussing the legalization of cannabis in Mexico.

Olvera appears on the show Ugly Delicious season 1, in the episode: "Tacos"

References

1976 births
Living people
Mexican chefs